The 2002 Women's Rugby World Cup was the second World Cup fully sanctioned by the sports governing body the International Rugby Board (IRB). The tournament was held in Barcelona, Spain. The format was the same as the previous tournament and again 16 nations competed.

For the first time a pre-tournament qualification match took place to decide Asia's second representative but other than that all competitors took part by invitation. 14 of the 16 teams taking part were the same as in 1998 but two lowest ranked European teams (Sweden and Russia) were replaced by teams from Asia (Japan) and Oceania (Samoa).

The competition was won by defending champions, New Zealand.

Squads

Match Officials

Referees:
S Cortabarria (Spain)
G De Santis (Italy)
Nicky Inwood (New Zealand)

Qualifier

Competition format 

The format was the same as the previous tournament and again 16 nations competed. The teams were divided into four pools of four teams each, according to each team's seeding.

For the first set of matches the highest seeded team played the lowest seeded team while the two mid-seeded teams played each other.
After the first round of matches the positions in each pool were recalculated with the winners of the first matches in first and second places, and the losers in third and fourth places.
In the second set of matches, the top two teams and the bottom two teams from each pool played each other. The final pool standings were calculated from the results of these matches to give the final four positions in each pool.

The four top teams in each of the pools went forward to contest the World Cup title. The second placed teams from each pool play for 5th position (the Plate), the third place teams for 9th (the Bowl), and the fourth placed teams for 13th (the Shield). The four teams in each of these groups are reseeded to decide who plays who at this stage of the tournament.

The two winning teams from each of these 'semi-finals' then faced each other in the 'final', whilst the losing teams played each other.

World Cup Tournament

Although not strictly speaking a knock-out as – in theory – a team losing a game on Day 1 could still qualify dependent on results on Day 2, in practice this was a complex tournament that is best understood by means of the following graphics. Note that this should not be taken to imply that the draw for any round of games was predetermined – each successive round was drawn using seedings and rankings based on previous matches:

Cup (positions 1–4)

Ranking matches 5–8
Teams knocked out in the Cup quarter-finals

Ranking matches 9–16
Teams defeated in the first round of pool matches

Ranking matches 13–16
Teams defeated in the first round of the ranking matches for 9–16

Match details

Pool A

Pool B

Pool C

Pool D

Overall ranking 
Teams were ranked according to the following criteria:
Most match points
Best points difference (points scored for minus points scored against)
Best tries difference (tries scored for minus tries scored against)
Best penalty kick difference (penalty kicks scored for minus penalty kicks scored against)
Most points scored for
Most tries scored for
Most penalty kicks scored for
Original Tournament seeding.

This resulted in the following ranking:

Play-offs

13th–16th

9th–12th

5th–8th

Semi-finals

Finals

15th/16th

13th/14th

11th/12th

9th/10th

7th/8th

5th/6th

3rd/4th

Final

Final table

Notes

References

External links
IRB reports (from Webarchive)
Information on the 2002 Women's Rugby World Championship (in Spanish)

 
2002
2002 rugby union tournaments for national teams
2001–02 in Spanish rugby union
R
International sports competitions hosted by Catalonia
2002 in women's rugby union
May 2002 sports events
Rugby union in Catalonia